One More Song for You is the 26th studio album by the Christian music group The Imperials, released in late 1979 on DaySpring Records. It was the first of two albums that the group collaborated with well-known musician/producer Michael Omartian, moving them to a more contemporary pop sound, with the second being their next album Priority (1980). "I'm Forgiven" went to number one on the Christian radio charts and stayed there for 13 weeks. The Imperials were winners at the 12th GMA Dove Awards winning three for Group of the Year, Artist of the Year and Pop/Contemporary Album of the Year with lead singer Russ Taff winning Male Vocalist of the Year. One More Song for You was nominated for a Grammy Award for Best Gospel Performance, Contemporary or Inspirational at the 23rd Grammy Awards. The album reached number one on the Billboard Inspirational Albums chart. CCM Magazine has ranked One More Song for You at number 75 on their 2001 book The 100 Greatest Albums in Christian Music.

Track listing

Personnel 

The Imperials
 Russ Taff – lead vocals
 Jim Murray – tenor, vocals
 David Will – baritone, vocals
 Armond Morales – bass, vocals

Musicians
 Michael Omartian – keyboards, percussion, arrangements
 Marty Walsh – guitars 
 Abraham Laboriel – bass 
 Paul Leim – drums 
 Victor Feldman – congas
 Kim Hutchcroft – horns, sax solos
 Jackie Kelso – horns 
 Dick Hyde – horns
 Chuck Findley – horns 
 Steve Madaio – horns
 Assa Drori – concertmaster 
 Myrna Matthews – additional backing vocals 
 Marti McCall – additional backing vocals 
 Stormie Omartian – additional backing vocals 

Production
 Michael Omartian – producer 
 John Guess – engineer, remixing
 John Banuelos – additional engineer 
 Jack Lees – additional engineer 
 Bernie Grundman – mastering at A&M Mastering Studios (Hollywood, California)
 Bob Anderson – album design, photography

Charts

Radio singles

Accolades
GMA Dove Awards

1981 Group of the Year
1981 Artist of the Year

References

1979 albums
The Imperials albums
Word Records albums
Albums produced by Michael Omartian